The 2000 PBA Governors Cup Finals was the best-of-7 championship series of the 2000 PBA Governors Cup and the conclusion of the Conference playoffs. The San Miguel Beermen and Purefoods TJ Hotdogs played for the 77th championship contested by the league.

San Miguel Beermen retains the Governors Cup title and captured their 15th PBA crown, defeating Purefoods TJ Hotdogs in their finals series, four games to one.

Danny Seigle won on his third Back To Back Finals MVP in Governors Cup Finals.

Series scoring summary

Games summary

Game 1

The hotdogs went up by six points, 63–57, going into the final quarter and were still ahead, 78–77, with four minutes left to play when Danny Seigle converted on a three-point play with a foul from Derrick Brown, giving the beermen an 80–78 lead. Danny's older brother, Andy Seigle from Purefoods, split his charities to narrow the gap at 79–80, but everything crumbled for the Hotdogs after Danny Seigle rambled downcourt with a fastbreak slam for a three-point beermen lead, 82–79.

Game 2

Lamont Strothers flicked a baseline fallaway as San Miguel watched Purefoods crumble at crunchtime. Derrick Brown missed three crucial free throws in the last 1.4 seconds. From a 59–72 deficit, the TJ Hotdogs climbed back to tie the count at 76-all on Dindo Pumaren's free throw with a minute left.

Game 3

Lamont Strothers hit back-to-back triples as San Miguel struggled to two overtimes to beat Purefoods. Strothers' trey give the beermen a comfortable 105–99 lead with a minute left. The beermen were down by seven at 78–85 with 1:24 to go in regulation. Strothers and Danny Seigle took turns in hitting from the arc to put them within a point, 87–88 with ten seconds left. Strothers could have ended the game in regulation but missed his second free throw on a foul by Derrick Brown with 0.8 seconds left. In the first overtime, Alvin Patrimonio missed a wayward three-pointer with 1.2 seconds left as San Miguel forces second extension at 97-all.

Game 4

A 14–0 burst by the Hotdogs increased their margin to 66–50 at the start of the second half. The beermen tried to come back in the last two minutes of the game, cutting the deficit to four points at 93–97. The Hotdogs wisely used time to its advantages.

Game 5

The beermen led by 16 points late in the third quarter as Danny Seigle went on a scoring frenzy. San Miguel used a solid endgame despite Purefoods' comeback try to finish off the hotdogs. Danny Seigle won on his third sophomore back to back Finals MVP and San Miguel captures on his back to back 2 peat champs 15th title.

Roster

Broadcast notes

References

External links
PBA official website

2000 PBA season
2000
San Miguel Beermen games
Magnolia Hotshots games
PBA Governors' Cup Finals